Vasant Kunj is a posh neighbourhood located in South West Delhi district, Delhi, India. Its nearest Metro Station is Vasant Vihar metro station. The area is home to several prominent personalities, one being the former prime minister of India, Dr Manmohan Singh, but also well-known members of the international ESD ExpertNet. The locality is also very close to Indira Gandhi International Airport and the commercial hub of Gurgaon. In the early '90s, Vasant Kunj was the agriculture-based land of Kishangarh Village.

Locality
Vasant Kunj was once farmland and was acquired by the government in the 1960s. The areas surrounding Vasant Kunj consist of farmland and the area is famous for palatial farmhouses. The locality is surrounded by greenery, with the South-Central Ridge of the Delhi Ridge encompassing the area and this forest is called Sanjay Van. The other residential areas in proximity are Chattarpur, Saket, Malviya Nagar, Mahipalpur, Lado Sarai, Ber Sarai, and Neb Sarai. The residential part of Vasant Kunj is divided into 5 Sectors – A, B, C, D and E. Each Sector is further divided into Pockets, for example, C1, C2, C3 up to C10. These pockets are further divided into blocks A, B, C ,D, E, F, G, and H until required

In history
Sultan Ghari tomb in Vasant Kunj is considered as the first Islamic mausoleum in Delhi. The historic Qutb Minar complex is located close to Vasant Kunj.

Economy
Bloomsbury India has its head office in the Vishrut Building (Building No. 3) in the DDA Complex in Vasant Kunj. Also the corporate offices of the Bharti Enterprises, Maruti Suzuki India Ltd. and Oil and Natural Gas Corporation are located in the area near Ambience mall. Research Center of American multi-national IBM is located at ISID Campus in Vasant Kunj.

DLF's Ambience, Promenade and Emporio located in Vasant Kunj has been touted as a fashion destination. Vasant Kunj is now famous for its Malls, build on land auctioned by DDA, as one of its largest value actions. The Malls include DLF Emporio, DLF Promenade, Ambience Mall. Another Mall that stands alone is the Vasant Square Mall.

Vasant Kunj has two Police Stations, divided into North and South.

Vasant Kunj also has two forests with access to the public. The Sanjay Van on JNU Road and the forest behind the Grand Hotel. There are also two big natural water bodies in Vasant Kunj, one behind Sector A, Pocket B & C and the second on the JNU road.

The Grand, a five-star luxury hotel, is located on Nelson Mandela Marg, Vasant Kunj. Monkey Bar is a thriving and trendy nightspot, where Indian-inspired global bites are served at this hip lounge bar under a striking glass pyramid.  Export Promotion Council for Handicrafts (E.P.C.H.) is located at Sector C in Vasant Kunj.

Vasant Kunj has had the distinction of having this country's first community yellow pages since October 1991, called the "Vasant Kunj Informer & Shopper," that had been reaching its booming population month after month, free-of-cost, with user-friendly information of professional services and entrepreneurial work that enhances the quality of the everyday lives of its readers. This community publication has touched the lives of thousands of advertisers and readers, especially the student community, in many ways and has added to the vibrancy of its economy. Unfortunately, it has closed down due to changes in the economy after Covid 2020, despite having tried a digital version of the Yellow Pages.

Education
TERI University is located in Vasant Kunj. The new integrated, spacious campus of School of Panning and Architecture is undergoing construction off Nelson Mandela Marg. Jawarlal Nehru University (J.N.U.) including IIMC (Indian Institute of Mass Communications) is surrounded by Vasant Kunj on its west and south. They also have management school Jagannath International Management School.
Shaurya CRPF Officers Training institute is also located in the Vasant Kunj's institutional area near sector C.

Some of the prominent schools in the neighbourhood includes Delhi Public School- Vasant Kunj, Vasant Valley School, G.D. Goenka Public School, D.A.V public school, Bhatnagar International School, Ryan International School, The Heritage School, Bloom Public School and Deep Public School.

Some of the playschools and nursery schools are Tender Feet Nursery School, Aadyant Global School, Steady Steps International Preschool.

Sports
Vasant Kunj Sports Complex is one of the prominent sports complexes developed by Delhi Development Authority. Beeya's Riding Facility in Vasant Kunj is a nationally recognized horse riding club.

Health care
Indian Spinal Injuries Centre, Institute of Liver and Biliary Sciences, Fortis Flt. Lt. Rajan Dhall Hospital are some of the prominent hospitals located in Vasant Kunj. Others include New Delhi Children's Hospital & Research Centre (NDCHRC).

Government offices
Central Reserve Police Force's Officers training institute- Shaurya, Pension Fund Regulatory and Development Authority, National Book Trust, International Centre for Alternate Dispute Resolution are located in Vasant Kunj Institutional Area.Indian Aviation Academy. It also features the South Delhi police station.

See also
 Defence Colony
 Greater Kailash
 South West Delhi district
 South Delhi district

References

New Delhi
Neighbourhoods in Delhi
South West Delhi district